Ballinrobe Community School is a secondary school in Ballinrobe, County Mayo. It is a mixed gender school and it was opened in September 1990, after the merging of 3 second level schools in Ballinrobe. As of the start of the 2020 school year, William Culkeen was the principal and 674 students (325 boys and 349 girls) were enrolled in the school.

History 
The school was founded after the Sacred Heart Secondary School, the Christian Brothers school and the Vocational school merged in 1990.

In the 1850s, the Sisters of Mercy provided Ballinrobe with primary education, founding the Mercy Intermediate School in 1920 and later founding the Sacred Heart Secondary School.

The Christian Brothers opened a second level school in 1879 and 10 pupils were prepared for the first Intermediate exams held in Ireland in that year.

The Vocational School opened in 1962.

Academics 
The school teaches Junior and Senior Cycle as well as offering an optional Transition Year. 

Several students in the school have scored the country's top marks in the Leaving Certificate, with one student achieving 8 A1s in 2002, and another also with 8 A1s in 2016.

Extracurricular 
The school offers sporting and extracurricular activities to its students.

The school's Gaelic football team won the 2017 Paddy Drummond Cup. In golf, a team from the school won the Irish Schools Junior Championship in 2013.

References 

Secondary schools in County Mayo
1990 establishments in Ireland
Educational institutions established in 1990